The National Equal Rights League (NERL) is the oldest nationwide human rights organization in the United States. It was founded in Syracuse, New York in 1864 dedicated to the liberation of black people in the United States. Its origins can be traced back to the emancipation of slaves in the British West Indies in 1833. The league emphasized moral reform and self-help, aiming "to encourage sound morality, education, temperance, frugality, industry, and promote everything that pertains to a well-ordered and dignified life."
 Black leaders formed state and local branches of the league which drew many members, which caused the society to grow quickly, in areas such as Harrisburg, Pennsylvania, where people such as Thomas Morris Chester joined.

Organizational history

Origins

As a result of the 1833 British West Indies emancipation, a large celebration of pro-abolitionist free black men was held in Buffalo, New York.  During this celebration, planning began for the creation of a wholly black organization to fight for the human rights for blacks in the United States. Ten years later, in 1843, after the establishment of several state conventions, the first National Convention of Colored Men of America was held in Buffalo with several hundred delegates, free black men and escaped slaves, from throughout the U.S.  

At this convention, the Chairman Samuel H. Davis defined their purpose:

"... we wish to secure for ourselves, in common with other citizens, the privilege of seeking our own happiness in any part of the country we choose ... unconstitutionally denied us in part of this union. We wish also to secure the elective franchise in those states where it is denied us - where are rights are legislated away, and our voice is neither heard nor regarded. We also wish to secure, for our children especially, the benefits of education, which in several States are entirely denied to us, and in others, are enjoyed only in name. These, and many other things, of which we justly complain, bear most heavily upon us as a people; and it is our right and our duty to seek for redress, in that way which will lead most likely the desired end."The NERL founding members included Henry Highland Garnet, Fredrick Douglass, and John Mercer Langston. The organization originated in New York but quickly expanded at the conclusion of the civil war. 

Several resolutions were passed endorsing the abolition of slavery, legal equality regardless of color or race, and black manhood suffrage.  The members also wrote their own constitution and founded the National Equal Rights League (NERL), and its subsidiary state Equal Rights Leagues.

The NERL used the susu economics practices of its many West Indies immigrant members to fund its activities, which included the establishment of self-sufficient black communities (Black Wall Streets) throughout the U.S. The work of the membership of the NERL created such other organizations as the National Negro Business League, the National Negro Bar Association, and the Pan-African Conference.  

The NERL also had significant international influence. Its leadership was received by heads of state, and they even had a delegate attend the Paris Peace Conference of 1919. The two best-known leaders of the organization were John Mercer Langston and William Monroe Trotter. Other notable members included Madam C. J. Walker, Ida B. Wells-Barnett (who founded its Anti-Lynching Bureau), Mary Church Terrell, Marcus Garvey, Octavius V. Catto, Charles Lewis Reason, John Rock, William Cooper Nell, Moses Dickson, and Frederick Douglass.

Formation of a rival organization

In 1905, NERL leaders met with other black leaders, in what is now known as the Niagara Movement, to discuss the growing debate between followers of Booker T. Washington and followers of W. E. B. Du Bois, who called for an end to discrimination, and to develop a new strategy for dealing with race relations at the turn of the 20th century.  At this meeting, Du Bois unsuccessfully tried to convince the NERL members present, Trotter and Wells-Barnett, that white Americans should be permitted to join the NERL. When his pleas went unheeded, Du Bois left the organization and joined the National Association for the Advancement of Colored People.

With the continued growth of the NAACP, the NERL lost prominence and by 1921 most members had joined the NAACP.

Proceedings
 Proceedings of the First Annual Meeting of the National Equal Rights League Held in Cleveland, Ohio, October 19, 20, and 21, 1865

See also
 Frederick Douglass
 Henry Highland Garnet
 John Mercer Langston
 Negro Sanhedrin

Footnotes

Further reading
 Davis, Hugh.  "We Will Be Satisfied With Nothing Less": The African American Struggle for Equal Rights in the North During Reconstruction (Cornell University Press, 2011).
 Davis, Hugh.  "The Pennsylvania State Equal Rights League and the Northern Black Struggle for Legal Equality, 1864-1877," Pennsylvania Magazine of History and Biography 126#4 (October 2002) pp: 611-634.
 
African Americans' rights organizations
Pre-emancipation African-American history
Abolitionism in the United States
United States political action committees